Matilde Kirilovsky de Creimer (24 February 1912 – 13 September 2000), better known by her penname Matilde Alba Swann, was an Argentine poet, journalist, and lawyer. She was one of the first women to earn a law degree at the National University of La Plata, in 1933.

Biography
Matilde Kirilovsky was born in Berisso on 24 February 1912, the daughter of Russian immigrants Alaquin Kirilovsky and Emma Ioffe. She earned her baccalaureate at the Colegio Superior de Señoritas (now Liceo Víctor Mercante) in 1929, and her licentiate in law at the National University of La Plata in 1933.

She married Samuel Creimer in the 1940s, and they had five children.

She published eight books of poetry and countless newspaper articles. She was a correspondent for the newspaper El Día during the Falklands War. Her poems were praised by Jorge Luis Borges, and she was close friends with writer Ernesto Sabato.

She died in La Plata on 13 September 2000, and was buried at La Plata Cemetery.

Awards and recognition
 Province of Buenos Aires Award for Poetry, 1991
 Santa Clara de Asís Award from the League of Family Mothers, 1991
 Nomination for the Nobel Prize in Literature, 1992
 Declared an Illustrious Citizen of the City of La Plata, Post Mortem, 2005
 Augusto Mario Delfino Award for Poetry

Publications
 Canción y grito (1955)
 Salmo al retorno (1956)
 Madera para mi mañana (1957)
 Tránsito del infinito adentro (1959)
 Coral y remolino (1960)
 Grillo y cuna (1971)
 Con un hijo bajo el brazo (1978)
 Crónica de mí misma (1980)

References

External links
  

1912 births
2000 deaths
20th-century Argentine lawyers
20th-century Argentine poets
20th-century Argentine women writers
Argentine war correspondents
Argentine women journalists
Argentine women lawyers
Argentine women poets
Burials at La Plata Cemetery
National University of La Plata alumni